Chava Alberstein (born 8 December 1946 in Poland) is an Israeli musician, lyricist, composer, and musical arranger.

Biography
Born Ewa Alberstein in Szczecin, Poland, her name was Hebraized to Chava when she moved to Israel with her family in 1950. She grew up in Kiryat Haim.

In 1964, when she was seventeen, Alberstein was invited to appear at the Hammam Nightclub in Jaffa. She sang four songs, accompanied by herself on guitar and her brother Alex on the clarinet. The program was broadcast live on the radio. After a guest appearance on Moadon Hazemer, recorded on Kibbutz Beit Alfa, she signed a recording contract with CBS. Early in her career, she appeared at the Amami Cinema in Haifa's Neve Sha'anan neighborhood. Haaretz columnist Neri Livneh described her as "a little slip of a thing in a blue youth movement shirt, her face covered by huge glasses".

Alberstein was drafted into the Israel Defense Forces in 1965 and became one of many Israeli artists to rise to stardom by entertaining the troops.

Musical career
Alberstein has released more than sixty albums. She has recorded in Hebrew, English, and Yiddish. In 1980, she began to write and compose. Most of the songs on her album Mehagrim are her own work. Alberstein's husband was the filmmaker Nadav Levitan, who wrote the lyrics for her album End of the Holiday. In 1986, Alberstein wrote music for her husband's film Stalin's Disciples. Levitan died in 2010. Alberstein's songs have been included in a number of multi-artist collections, among them Songs of The Vilna Ghetto and The Hidden Gate – Jewish Music Around the World.

Critical acclaim
According to Israel's second largest daily newspaper, Yedioth Ahronoth, Alberstein is the most important female folk singer in Israeli history:

Political views and controversy

Alberstein is a champion of liberal causes. Throughout her career, she has been an activist for human rights and Arab-Israeli unity. In 1989, her song "Had Gadya" (an altered version of the song traditionally sung at the Passover seder), in which she criticizes Israel's policy towards Palestinians, was banned by Israel State Radio. The song was later used in the film Free Zone by director Amos Gitai in Natalie Portman's seven-minute crying scene.

Alberstein is also a champion of the Yiddish language, both in her recordings and in a video titled "Too Early to Be Quiet, Too Late to Sing", which showcases the works of Yiddish poets.

Awards
Alberstein has won the Kinor David (David's Harp) Prize. In 1999, she received the Itzik Manger Prize. On 28 January 2011, she received the Lifetime Achievement Music Award from the Israel Association of Composers, Authors and Publishers of Musical Works, and holds honorary doctorates from Tel Aviv University and the Weizmann Institute of Science of Israel. On 13 May 2018, she was awarded an honorary doctorate in music from Brandeis University.

Quotes
 "Even though I have lived in Israel nearly my entire life, I am constantly questioning my place in the world. Maybe this searching comes from being an artist, maybe it comes from being a Jew. I'm not really sure".

Discography

References

External links
 
 Chava Alberstein at Aviv Productions
 Chava Alberstein at Nature et Culture (archived)

1946 births
Living people
Polish emigrants to Israel
Israeli people of Polish-Jewish descent
English-language singers from Israel
20th-century Israeli women singers
21st-century Israeli women singers
Yiddish-language singers
Israeli film score composers
Israeli women writers
Jewish folk singers
Label Bleu artists
Itzik Manger Prize recipients